This article shows all participating team squads at the 2016 Men's European Water Polo Championship, held in Serbia from 10 to 23 January 2016.

Group A









Group B









Group C









Group D









Statistics

Player representation by club
Clubs with 8 or more players represented are listed.

Coaches representation by country
Coaches in bold represent their own country.

References

European Water Polo Championship squads
Men's European Water Polo Championship
Men squads